The Praetorian Building is an historic 7-story building located at 601 Franklin Avenue in Waco, McLennan County, Texas. Designed by the Dallas architectural firm of C. W. Bulger & Co. in the Chicago school or Modern style of architecture, it was built it 1915 by Hughes O'Rourke Construction to house the Praetorian Insurance Company whose main office, the Praetorian Building in Dallas, had been designed by C. E. Bulger in 1905. Other names the building has borne over the years are Franklin Tower, the Service Mutual Building and Southwestern Building.

See also

National Register of Historic Places listings in McLennan County, Texas

References

External links

Commercial buildings on the National Register of Historic Places in Texas
Chicago school architecture in Texas
Buildings and structures completed in 1915
Charles William Bulger buildings
Buildings and structures in Waco, Texas
National Register of Historic Places in McLennan County, Texas